Mataeo Durant (born December 4, 1999) is an American football running back for the St. Louis BattleHawks for the XFL. He played college football at Duke.

High school career
Durant played high school football at McCormick High School in South Carolina. As a senior in 2017, he gained 768 yards in just four games.

College career
He played college football for the Duke Blue Devils from 2018 to 2021. As a junior in 2020, he rushed for 817 yards and received the team's most valuable player award. As a senior in 2021, he rushed for 1,241 yards and scored 11 touchdowns. His 2021 total set Duke's single-season rushing yardage record.

In December 2021, Durant declared for the 2022 NFL Draft.

Professional career

Pittsburgh Steelers
After his college career, Durant was signed by the Pittsburgh Steelers as an undrafted free agent on April 30, 2022. He was released on August 23, 2022.

St. Louis BattleHawks 
On November 17, 2022, Durant was drafted by the St. Louis BattleHawks of the XFL.

References

External links
 Pittsburgh Steelers bio
 Duke Blue Devils bio

Living people
1999 births
American football running backs
Duke Blue Devils football players
People from McCormick, South Carolina
Pittsburgh Steelers players
Players of American football from South Carolina
St. Louis BattleHawks players